Colonel Assimi Goïta (born  1983) is a Malian military officer who has been interim President of Mali since 28 May 2021. Goïta later took power from Bah Ndaw after the 2021 Malian coup d'état and has since been declared interim president of Mali.

Biography 

Assimi Goïta was born in 1983. He is married to Lala Diallo, who is a member of the Fula people.

Goïta served as a colonel in the Autonomous Special Forces Battalion, the special forces unit of the Malian Armed Forces. He heads the Malian special forces in the center of the country with the rank of colonel. He is thus confronted with the jihadist insurgency in Mali. In 2018, he met Mamady Doumbouya, from Guinea, in Burkina Faso during a training session organised by the US army, which was reserved for the region's special forces commanders. Both he and Mamady Doumbouya would later launch military coups against their governments.

Goïta received training from the United States, France, and Germany, and had experience working with United States Army Special Forces.

Goïta serves as the leader of the National Committee for the Salvation of the People, a group of rebels who overthrew Ibrahim Boubacar Keïta in the 2020 Malian coup d'état, and have pledged to initiate new elections to replace him. Because of this pledge, the Economic Community of West African States (ECOWAS) pressured Mali's ruling junta for the country to be led by a civilian. On 21 September he was named vice president by a group of 17 electors, with Bah Ndaw being appointed president. He was appointed vice president of the Transition on 21 September 2020, a position he was to have held for 18 months, until new elections. He took the oath of office on 25 September 2020. On 1 October 2020, the "Mali Transition Letter" was published where it was specified, in response to the request of the ECOWAS, that the vice president "in charge of defense and security issues" would not be able to replace President Bah Ndaw.

On 24 May 2021, Goïta was involved in the 2021 Malian coup d'état, after which he seized power. President Ndaw and Prime Minister Moctar Ouane were detained. Goïta claimed that Ndaw was attempting to "sabotage" the transition to democracy, and committed to elections in 2022. The coup was instigated by Goïta's claim that Ndaw failed to consult him about a cabinet reshuffle. It was alleged that one of the motives for the latest coup was the removal of Colonel Sadio Camara as defense minister. Camara was appointed again as defense minister by Goïta upon taking over again.

On 28 May 2021, the constitutional court declared him interim president of Mali. The court ruling stated that Goïta should carry the title "president of the transition, head of state" to "lead the transition process to its conclusion". On the same day, he said that he would name a prime minister from the M5-RFP coalition.

Assassination attempt 
On 20 July 2021, during an assassination attempt, Goïta was attacked by a knifeman while praying at the Grand Mosque in Bamako amid festivities for the Eid al-Adha. The attacker was then immediately arrested after failing to stab the President. Overall two men were arrested by the security forces. One of them was however found to be a special forces soldier wrongly assumed to be the attacker's accomplice. The knifeman, identified as a teacher, died in custody five days after the attack. The cause of death is unknown.

References 

1983 births
Living people
Malian Muslims
Year of birth uncertain
Date of birth missing (living people)
Leaders who took power by coup
Heads of state of Mali
Malian military personnel
Vice presidents of Mali
Colonels (military rank)
21st-century Malian people